The Ethiopian passport is a travel document issued to citizens of Ethiopia for international travel. The document is a biometric machine-readable passport with a burgundy cover with the text "Federal Democratic Republic of Ethiopia" above the coat of arms, and the text "passport" below it in Amharic and English. The passport is valid for 5 years and contains 64 pages.

History
Nelson Mandela was clandestinely issued an Ethiopian passport in 1961. He used it to travel around the world until his arrest. He never obtained a South African passport by the Apartheid regime, and only got his first after his release in the 1990s.

Visa requirements

As of 1 January 2017, Ethiopian citizens had visa-free or visa on arrival access to 37 countries and territories, ranking the Ethiopian passport 96th in terms of travel freedom (tied with Kosovan, Lebanese and South Sudanese passports) according to the Henley visa restrictions index.

See also
Visa requirements for Ethiopian citizens

References

External links
 New Passport Requirements - Ethiopian embassy in London
 Nelson Mandela's first Ethiopian passport
 Ethiopian embassy in Washington

Ethiopia
Government of Ethiopia